Białystok-Krywlany Airport  is an airport in Białystok, Poland.

History

The selection of the area for a new airfield occurred on February 19, 1930, on the premises of the Provincial Committee LOPP on Warsaw Street. A representative of the Department of Aerospace, Engineer Hennenberg, presented four alternatives for the location of the airfield, indicating the area situated between the property Dojlidy and forest west of the farm Krywlany. After three years of negotiations, a decision was made. In 1935, the first hangar facilities and buildings were built. The airfield served as a backup landing base for the fifth Aviation Regiment in Lida. Shortly before the outbreak of World War II, lighting was installed for night flights and construction started on a concrete runway. During World War II, the airport benefited from its use by the German Air Force.

Post-war activity 1945-onwards
Shortly after the war, the Bialystok Branch of the LOT Polish Airlines was created. On 30 April 1945, airlines began flying routes every week on Mondays, Wednesdays, and Fridays using Douglas DC-3 aircraft. The flight from Bialystok to Warsaw lasted 50 minutes and tickets cost 400 zł. This service was quickly discontinued. Since that time the airport has not seen regular service, with only gliders utilizing the airport.  During the mid-'80s border guards stationed helicopters and light aircraft at the airport, in addition to a helicopter ambulance.

Passenger airport extension
Currently, Białystok is the largest EU city without an operating commercial airport . New plans have been announced to extend and modernize the airport, including the addition of a new runway to offer a passenger airline service. This led to a referendum in 2017.

Passenger airport referendum
A  referendum was held 15 January 2017, with 96% of the voters showing support for a new regional airport. Turnout was just 12.96%, not enough for the results to be considered binding. The majority of voters were inhabitants of Białystok.

Bibliography
 Lehmann, Ernst A.; Mingos, Howard. 1927. The Zeppelins. The Development of the Airship, with the Story of the Zeppelin Air Raids in the World War. Published by I. H. SEARS & COMPANY, Inc. New York International Clearinghouse for Hydrogen Based Commerce - Zepplins (online chapters I to VII)

See also
List of airports in Poland
List of airports in Poland with unpaved runways
List of airports
 Air ambulances in Poland

References

Airports in Poland
Buildings and structures in Białystok
Transport in Białystok